The Master of the Weibermacht (sometimes called the Master of 1462) was a German engraver active in the Lower Rhine area between about 1450 and 1460.  His name comes from the work for which he is best known, a large-format engraving of an original interpretation of the common theme of Weibermacht, or the "Power of Women".  A further group of engravings, depicting both religious and secular subjects, has also been attributed to him on the basis of style; the works in question show coarse draughtsmanship, and their engraving technique is similar.  These works have nonetheless been ascribed to various artists at one time or another.

External links
23 works by the Master of the Weibermacht at Zeno.org

German engravers
Weibermacht, Master of the
15th-century engravers